The Panel may refer to:

 The Panel (Australian TV series)
 The Panel (Irish TV series)

See also 
 Panel (disambiguation)